Sainsbury is an English surname. Notable people with the surname include:

Alfred Sainsbury (1856–1920), Australian police chief 
Amanda Sainsbury-Salis (born 1969), Australian molecular scientist, educator and author
Amber Sainsbury (born 1978), New Zealand actress
Ben Sainsbury (born 1972), Canadian-American film director
Edward Sainsbury (1851–1930), English cricketer
Lionel Sainsbury (born 1958), English classical composer
Mark Sainsbury (broadcaster) (born 1956), New Zealand journalist and broadcaster
Mark Sainsbury (philosopher) (born 1943), British philosopher
Murray Sainsbury (born 1940), Australian politician
Peter Sainsbury (1934–2014), English cricketer
Roger Sainsbury (bishop) (born 1936), British Anglican bishop
Tony Sainsbury, British chef de mission at multiple Paralympic Games
Trent Sainsbury (born 1992), Australian footballer
Sainsbury family, members founded Sainsbury's supermarket chain in the UK

English-language surnames